The following is a comprehensive discography of UFO, an English hard rock band formed in 1968. The band became a transitional band between early hard rock and heavy metal and the new wave of British heavy metal. UFO's influence was strongly felt in the 1980s heavy metal scene and they have been cited as a primary influence of Steve Harris of Iron Maiden, Kirk Hammett of Metallica, Dave Mustaine of Megadeth, Joey Tempest of Europe, Frank Hannon of Tesla, and Mike McCready of Pearl Jam, among others.

Albums

Studio albums

Live albums

Compilation albums

Singles

Notes:
 a^ - Released in the UK only
 b^ - Released in Germany
 c^ - Released in EU
 d^ - Released in the US/Canada
 e^ - Released in the Netherlands
 f^ - Released in Japan

Videos

References

External links
 
 Entry at 45cat.com

Heavy metal group discographies
Discographies of British artists